The defunct railroads of North America regrouped several railroads in Canada, Mexico, and the United States.  The following is a list of the past railroad companies.

Defunct railroad companies

Algoma Central Railway (AC)
Atchison, Topeka and Santa Fe Railway (ATSF)
Atlantic Coast Line Railroad (ACL)
Auto-Train Corporation (AUT)
Baltimore and Ohio Railroad (B&O)
Bangor and Aroostook Railroad (BAR)
Beaumont, Sour Lake & Western Railroad  
Boston and Albany Railroad (B&A)
Boston and Maine Corporation (BM)
Buffalo Bayou, Brazos & Colorado
Burlington, Cedar Rapids and Northern Railway (BCR&N) 
Burlington Northern Railroad (BN)
Canadian Northern Railway (CNoR)
Central of Georgia Railway
Central Pacific Railroad (CPRR)
Central Railroad of New Jersey (Jersey Central) (CNJ)
Central Vermont (CV)
Chesapeake and Ohio Railway (CO) 
Chicago, Burlington and Quincy Railroad (CBQ)
Chicago, Milwaukee, St. Paul and Pacific Railroad (MILW)
Chicago Great Western Railway (CGW)
Chicago, Rock Island and Pacific Railroad (RI)
Chicago and North Western Transportation Company (CNW)
Cincinnati, Jackson and Mackinaw Railroad
Cincinnati, Saginaw, and Mackinaw Railroad 
Colorado and Southern Railway (C&S)
Columbia Tap Railway
Conrail (CR)
Denver and Rio Grande Western Railroad (D&RGW)
Detroit, Toledo and Milwaukee Railroad (DT&M) 
Detroit and Pontiac Railroad (D&P)
Detroit, Grand Haven and Milwaukee Railway (DGH&M)
Detroit, Toledo & Ironton Railroad (DTI)
Erie Railroad (Erie)
Florida Overseas Railroad
Galveston, Harrisburg and San Antonio Railroad
Grand Trunk (GT)
Great Northern Railway (GN)
Gulf, Colorado and Santa Fe Railway
Fernley and Lassen Railway
Fredericksburg and Northern Railway
Hudson Bay Railway (HBR)
Houston Belt & Terminal Railroad
Houston, East & West Texas Railroad
Houston & Texas Central Railroad
Illinois Central Railroad (IC)
Inter-California Railway 
Intercolonial Railway of Canada (IRC)
International–Great Northern Railroad
LaPorte Houston Northern Railway
Lackawanna Railroad (Lackawanna)
Louisville and Nashville Railroad (LN)
Macon and Birmingham Railway (M&B)
Maine Central (MEC)
Minneapolis and St. Louis Railway (MSTL)
Missouri–Kansas–Texas Railroad (MKT) (also known as the "KATY")
Missouri Pacific Railroad (MP)
National Transcontinental Railway (NTR)
New Orleans and Carrollton Railroad
New Orleans, Jackson and Great Northern Railroad
New Orleans & Nashville Railroad – see Uptown New Orleans.
New York Central (NYC)
New York, New Haven and Hartford Railroad (NH) 
New York, Ontario and Western Railroad (OW)
New York, Chicago and St. Louis Railroad (NKP)
Norfolk and Western Railway (NW)
Northern Pacific Railway (NP)
Northern Railway of Canada (NRC)
Penn Central (PC)
Pennsylvania Railroad (PRR)
Pontchartrain Railroad
Pontiac and Detroit Railroad
Prince Edward Island Railway (PEIR)
Raleigh and Gaston Railroad
Reading Railroad (RDG)
St. Louis, Brownsville & Mexico Railroad
San Antonio & Aransas Pass Railroad
Seaboard Air Line Railroad (SAL) 
Southern Pacific Transportation Company (SP)
Spokane, Portland and Seattle Railway (SPSR)
Texas and New Orleans Railroad (TNO) 
Toledo, Ann Arbor, and North Michigan Railway Company (T, AA & NM) 
Toledo, Saginaw, and Mackinaw Railroad 
Trinity & Brazos Valley Railroad
Tuckerton Railroad (TRR)
Tuskegee Railroad
Warren and Ouachita Valley (W&OV) 
Western Maryland Railway (WM)
Western Pacific Railroad (WP)
Wilmington and Raleigh Railroad
Wisconsin Central Ltd. (WC)

See also

List of defunct Canadian railways
List of reporting marks
List of U.S. Class I railroads
Transportation in the United States
Narrow gauge railroads in the United States
List of common carrier freight railroads in the United States
List of defunct North Carolina railroads
List of defunct Louisiana railroads
 History of rail transport in Canada

References

 
Canadian railways
Canada railway-related lists
United States railway-related lists
 
Railroads
North America
Railroads of North America
North America transport-related lists